Brian Gottfried was the defending champion but lost in the final 1–6, 6–0, 6–1, 6–2 to Ivan Lendl.

Seeds
The draw allocated unseeded players at random; as a result seven seeds received a bye into the second round.

  Ivan Lendl (champion)
  Brian Gottfried (final)
  Stan Smith (semifinals)
  Tomáš Šmíd (semifinals)
  Sandy Mayer (quarterfinals)
  Rolf Gehring (quarterfinals)
  Carlos Kirmayr (quarterfinals)
  Shlomo Glickstein (second round)
  John Austin (third round)
  Sammy Giammalva Jr. (second round)
  Stanislav Birner (third round)
  Pavel Složil (third round)
  Ulrich Pinner (first round)
  Trey Waltke (first round)
  Ángel Giménez (first round)
  Nick Saviano (third round)

Draw

Finals

Top half

Section 1

Section 2

Bottom half

Section 3

Section 4

External links
 1981 Fischer-Grand Prix draw

1981 Fischer-Grand Prix